Air Highnesses is a cargo airline from Armenia. The airline commenced operations in 2008. The airline has its main hub at Zvartnots International Airport and its fleet consists of one Ilyushin Il-76 aircraft.

Fleet

Incidents and accidents
 30 November 2012 - Freighter aircraft bearing registration EK-76300 (Ilyushin Il-76T), owned and operated by Air Highnesses (on behalf of Congolese cargo airline Aéro-Service) crashed at Maya-Maya Airport while landing, killing five crew members, one passenger and 26 people on the ground (a total of 32 fatalities). 14 people on the ground were injured in the accident.

See also
 List of airlines of Armenia
 List of airports in Armenia
 Transport in Armenia

References 

Airlines of Armenia
Airlines established in 2008
Armenian companies established in 2008